The Sony E 18-105mm F4 OSS is a fixed maximum aperture zoom lens for the Sony E-mount, released by Sony on August 27, 2013.

The 18-105mm F4.0 G lens is least expensive G-series lens Sony makes. It is popular among professionals and hobbyists who want G-lens quality and a wide zoom range without spending thousands of dollars.

Build quality
The 18-105mm features a minimalist metal exterior reminiscent of Sony's Zeiss lenses. The 18-105mm lens features a wide electronic zoom ring encircling the lens barrel, as well as a much narrower electronic focusing ring. A two-speed power-zoom rocker can be found on the side of the lens. There is no zoom lock to prevent zoom creep due to the zoom mechanism being inside the lens barrel itself.

Image quality
The lens is consistently sharp throughout its zoom range, softening up only at the extreme corners of the image. Vignetting is noticeable at F4, but stopping down generally resolves this issue. Strong pin-cushion distortion, though largely corrected in-lens, is apparent throughout the frame when shooting in RAW. Chromatic aberration, restricted to the corners, but occurring at all apertures, is mildly apparent from 18-24mm and at 105mm.

See also
List of Sony E-mount lenses
Sony E 16-70mm F4 ZA

References

Camera lenses introduced in 2013
18-105